Jafar Ali Shah was a politician from Chitral, Pakistan. He was the grandson of Ataliq Bahader Shah and son of Ataliq Sarfraz Shah. He won all of the elections he participated in. He was a Member of the Legislative Assembly from Chitral during the Zulfiqar Bhutto era and was Member of the Shoora during the Zia ul Haq era. He helped to create the Lowari Tunnel.

People from Chitral